Martin Edward Daubney (born 22 June 1970) is a British commentator, journalist and former politician who was the deputy leader of the Reclaim Party from 2021 until August 2022. Daubney was a Brexit Party Member of the European Parliament (MEP) for the East Midlands from 2019 to 2020. He was the longest-serving editor of the men's lifestyle magazine Loaded.

Early life
Daubney was born on 22 June 1970 in Nottingham. He grew up in Gedling, Nottinghamshire. His father was a coal miner and his mother was a teacher. He has one sister. His early education was at Carlton le Willows School. He studied geography at the University of Manchester, graduating with a 2:1 class degree. Daubney was the first man in his family to graduate from university.

Magazine and TV career 
His first job in journalism was as a researcher for the women's magazine Bella in 1995. Two years later, he was promoted to commissioning editor. Daubney then became the features editor for the men's lifestyle magazine, FHM in the late 1990s. After this, he was the editor of page3.com for the tabloid newspaper The Sun. He then wrote articles for the sports section of the tabloid newspaper News of the World before becoming the deputy editor of the men's lifestyle magazine Loaded in February 2003. In September that year, he was promoted to editor. In 2007, he organised a straight pride march as he felt that heterosexuality was being "undermined" and becoming "unfashionable".

Daubney left Loaded in November 2010, after sales that peaked in the second half of 1998 to an average of 457,318 copies a month, had fallen to just a monthly average of 53,591. He was the longest serving editor of the magazine. After leaving the magazine, he became a "stay-at-home dad", amid reports that he had postnatal depression following the birth of his first child.

In 2013, Daubney spent six months making a documentary for Channel 4 on pornography addiction called Porn on the Brain. He supports the men's rights movement.

In November 2022, he started a stand-in presenting role on GB News TV and radio channel, being seen on weekend 'Breakfast with Stephen & Anne' co-presenting with Angela Rippon.

Political career 
Daubney was a Labour Party supporter until the election of Ed Miliband as party leader in 2010. He reports that he has also voted for the Liberal Democrats and the Women's Equality Party in the past. He voted for the United Kingdom to leave the European Union in the 2016 membership referendum. Daubney supported a no-deal Brexit.

On 25 April 2019, it was announced that Daubney would stand for the Brexit Party in the European Parliament election on 23 May. He was second on his party's list in the West Midlands constituency and was elected as one of its three MEPs there. In the European Parliament, he was a member of the Committee on Regional Development and was part of the delegation for relations with the Korean Peninsula.

Daubney was the Brexit Party candidate for Ashfield in the 2019 general election. He finished fourth with 2,501 votes (saving his deposit, with 5.1% of the vote), behind the Conservative, Ashfield Independents and Labour candidates.

In August 2021, Daubney was appointed deputy leader of Laurence Fox's Reclaim Party. He was the party's candidate in the 2021 North Shropshire by-election, he finished seventh with 375 votes (0.98 per cent), losing his deposit and narrowly just beating "The Monster Raving Loony Party".

Personal life
Daubney is married to Diana James and they have two children. They met while working together at The Sun.

See also
 Anti-pornography movement in the United Kingdom
 Lad culture

References

Living people
1970 births
Alumni of the University of Manchester
British magazine editors
Anti-pornography activists
People educated at Carlton le Willows Academy
People from Gedling (district)
People from Nottingham
People from Nottinghamshire
MEPs for England 2019–2020
Brexit Party MEPs
British journalists
English political commentators
Reform UK parliamentary candidates
GB News newsreaders and journalists